GOTJ  is an acronym that may refer to:

In entertainment:

 George of the Jungle, 1967 animated television series
 George of the Jungle (2007 TV series), 2007 remake of the 1967 series
 George of the Jungle (film), 1997 live-action film

Other uses:

 The Gathering of the Juggalos, music festival